Justin Hammer is a fictional character appearing in American comic books published by Marvel Comics. The character is depicted as a villainous entrepreneur, head of Hammer Industries and a frequent adversary of the superhero Iron Man. As he explains in his first major appearance, he is the reason why many of Iron Man's supervillain enemies have access to extremely advanced technology and why these foes use their equipment for violent crimes instead of profiting by bringing the designs to market. Hammer reveals that the villains are his underworld mercenaries, secretly armed and contractually obliged to fulfill missions against Hammer's competitors and enemies, such as Tony Stark.

Sam Rockwell portrayed the character in the Marvel Cinematic Universe film Iron Man 2 (2010), and the short film All Hail the King.

Publication history

Justin Hammer first appeared in Iron Man #120 (March 1979), and was created by David Michelinie, John Romita Jr., and Bob Layton. Layton himself recalled in a 2014 interview that he and Michelinie originally created Hammer as the cautionary tale of what kind of person Tony Stark might have become if he stayed on his path as a global war profiteer, as well as a tribute to actor Peter Cushing; in Layton's words, Stark and Hammer are essentially in the same line of work, but with diametrically opposed moral views.

Fictional character biography
Justin Hammer was born in Surrey, England and later became a citizen of Monaco. A rival of industrialist Tony Stark (Iron Man), multi-billionaire businessman Hammer later became a criminal financier using unethical methods using his company Hammer Industries as a front. In exchange for fifty percent of the crime profits, he would pay bail for costumed criminals and finance the development and replacement of both their weaponry and equipment. In the event that a mercenary under his employ violated his contract, Hammer would send an enforcement unit (usually led by his most reliable supervillain employee Blacklash) to attack the rogue and confiscate his assigned equipment.

At the start of the Demon in a Bottle storyline, Hammer invented a device called the Hypersonic Scan Transmitter which allowed him to take control of Iron Man's armor. He tested this remote control affecting Iron Man's unibeam, sealing plates, and boot jets. Angered that he had lost a lucrative bid to Stark International,  he took control of Iron Man's armor and forced him to kill the Carnelian ambassador, and set an army of superhuman criminals (consisting of Beetle I, Constrictor, Discus, Leap-Frog, Man-Killer, Porcupine I, Stiletto, and Water Wizard) against Iron Man. Ultimately, Tony Stark not only cleared his name and destroyed the control device, but finally learned that a major enemy was behind multiple attacks on his interests for years.

With help from the supervillain Force, Hammer next hijacked yachts to smuggle opium into the United States. They battled Iron Man and were defeated. When Stark lost his company to Obadiah Stane, Hammer left the destitute Stark to his own devices while continuing with his own enterprises. When Stark recovered and re-entered the business world with Stark Enterprises, Hammer sent the Adap-Tor (a robotic attack drone disguised as a helicopter) to attack the new company as a way of "welcoming" Stark back.

For a time, Hammer frequently hired the villain group known as the Death Squad in an attempt to kill both Tony Stark and Iron Man, but fired the group after they constantly failed.

When Force later attempted to go straight, Hammer sent Beetle, Blacklash, and Blizzard II to retrieve Force, but they were defeated by Force with help from Iron Man and Jim Rhodes.

During the "Armor Wars" storyline, Hammer had Tony Stark's Iron Man technology stolen by Spymaster and sold it to a number of superhumans who wore powered armor (including Stilt-Man, the Raiders, the Mauler, Beetle, Crimson Dynamo and the Titanium Man). Iron Man set about to disable the Stark-based technology in the suits in question, going so far as to also disable sanctioned technology in the armor of S.H.I.E.L.D.'S Mandroids and the Vault's Guardsmen, leading him into conflict with The Captain and his fellow Avengers.

Hammer later sent the Rhino (who Hammer once provided a removable version of his armor to) to break Blizzard out of prison. He sent his "B-Team" (Blacklash, Blizzard, and Boomerang) to battle Ghost and Iron Man.

Hammer redesigned Scorpion's tail and sent him to abduct General Musgrave. When Scorpion refused to complete his mission, Hammer sent Blacklash and the Rhino to retrieve the tail. Hammer later learned that Tony Stark had been shot, and ordered a batch of orchids to be sent to him with a card expressing condolences should he live. He sent Boomerang to raid a Stark Enterprises security office and hired Taskmaster to train the second Spymaster.

Later, Hammer agreed to design a new costume for Rhino. He sent Rhino and Boomerang to battle Cardiac. With the Life Foundation, Roxxon Oil, Stane International, and the Brand Corporation, he abducted a number of superhuman beings to analyze their abilities. He also helped the first Sphinx to reclaim the Ka-Stone.

Years later, it was revealed that Hammer had obtained Stane International after the death of its chairman Obadiah Stane, causing problems for Tony Stark through his old company. With operatives of HYDRA, Roxxon Oil, Moroboshi International, and the Trinational Commission, he tricked the Masters of Silence into attacking Stark Enterprises. Even when forced to sell his stock in Stane International to Stark for the sum of one dollar, Hammer had the last laugh when all the shady dealings and irresponsible, or even criminal actions of Stane International came back to bite Tony later.

Hammer later sent Barrier, Blacklash, and Ringer to recruit Luis Barrett to become the new Thunderbolt. The three villains were foiled by the Pantheon.

Discovering that he had been diagnosed with an incurable cancer-like illness, Hammer resolved to destroy Tony Stark before he died. He infected Stark's bloodstream with mood-altering nanites that made Stark irrational and temperamental. In a final confrontation with Iron Man on Hammer's own space station, Hammer was accidentally frozen in a block of ice when the water he fell into leaked out into space and instantly froze and is currently lost in space. While observing his body in a block of ice drifting in Earth's orbit, Iron Man reflected that his foe would now "live forever".

Powers and abilities
Justin Hammer is a normal, middle-aged man. He has a degree in commerce and business, and is an extremely efficient administrator with a genius-level intellect. He has access to various forms of advanced technology designed by his technicians.

Family
Justin is later revealed to be the father of Justine Hammer and the grandfather of Sasha Hammer who have each run Hammer Industries in his absence.

Other versions

Ultimate Marvel
The Ultimate Universe version is referred to as Justin Hammer, Jr. and is depicted as an industrialist. His late father Justin Hammer Sr. was a head industrialist and now he is the CEO of Hammer Industries and is from the south of the US rather than from Britain. He was rivals with Norman Osborn and was Osborn Industries's main competitor. In an effort to surpass Osborn Industries, Hammer hired Osborn's top scientist Otto Octavius for inside information. Octavius gets caught in a lab accident which grafted with four metal arms, blaming Hammer for this and sought him out for revenge. Doctor Octopus attacked Hammer in his limo, and Hammer subsequently died from a heart attack during Doctor Octopus' fight with Spider-Man.

Justin Hammer Jr. has also been secretly funding superhuman testing directly violating the Superhuman Test Ban Treaty; two of his more significant subjects were Electro and Sandman.

Justin Hammer Jr. is also responsible for the tech changes made on his daughter Justine Hammer.

Earth X
In the Earth X reality where a Terrigen epidemic mutates most of the world population, Hammer is murdered by Norman Osborn on his rise to being President of the United States.

In other media

Television
 Justin Hammer appears in Iron Man (1994), voiced by Tony Steedman in season one and Efrem Zimbalist Jr. in season two. This version is an ally of the Mandarin who seeks to make money off of the latter's plans to defeat Iron Man.
 Justin Hammer appears in Iron Man: Armored Adventures, voiced by Michael Adamthwaite. This version is the 21-year-old owner of Hammer Multinational and primary operator of the "Titanium Man" armor. After inheriting his family's fortune and company, Hammer arrives in New York to buy out Stark International, but fails to and resorts to criminal means. Throughout the series, Hammer displays vast influence in the criminal underworld and eagerness to take down the Stark company. After Hammer turns his accomplice Mr. Fix into an A.I., the latter seeks revenge by driving Hammer mad with paranoia and eventually exposing his criminal activities. Desperate to maintain his power, Hammer attempts to disperse a zombification gas throughout Manhattan, but Iron Man defeats him before Mr. Fix uses the gas on Hammer, who is taken into S.H.I.E.L.D. custody.
 Justin Hammer appears in Avengers Assemble, voiced by Jason Spisak. This version is modeled after Sam Rockwell's portrayal from Iron Man 2 (see below) and is the designer of various technological innovations such as the Super-Adaptoid, Dreadnoughts, and Mandroids. Throughout the series, he makes failed attempts to join the Cabal, has his technology hijacked by MODOK and Ultron, and battles the Avengers and Thunderbolts as the Mega-Mandroid before he is defeated by the two teams and arrested by the authorities.
 Justin Hammer appears in Lego Marvel Avengers: Climate Conundrum, voiced by Bill Newton. This version pilots the Detroit Steel armor.

Film
Justin Hammer appears in films set in the Marvel Cinematic Universe (MCU), portrayed by Sam Rockwell:
 Early stages of New Line Cinema's Iron Man (2008), produced by under David Hayter, Alfred Gough, and Miles Millar, had Hammer as an ancillary villain who operates as War Machine.
 Hammer makes his first official appearance in Iron Man 2 (2010). This version is an American defense contractor and rival to Tony Stark, who he appears closer to in age. Hammer attends Stark's Congress hearing to discuss selling Iron Man's armors, wherein the latter humiliates the former by displaying footage of Hammer's company failing to replicate the technology. In his quest to best Stark, Hammer recruits Ivan Vanko to build armored suits for him after breaking the latter out of prison and modifies James Rhodes's stolen Iron Man armor into the War Machine armor. While displaying Vanko's creations at the Stark Expo, Vanko betrays Hammer, who is arrested by the authorities.
 Hammer appears in the mid-credits scene of the Marvel One-Shot, All Hail the King. Having been incarcerated at Seagate Prison, he has entered a same-sex relationship with a younger inmate and criticizes fellow inmate Trevor Slattery.

Video games
 The MCU incarnation of Justin Hammer appears as a playable character in Lego Marvel's Avengers, voiced again by Jason Spisak.
 Justin Hammer appears in Marvel's Avengers, voiced by Nicolas Roye.

References

External links
 Justin Hammer at Marvel.com
 Justin Hammer at Marvel Wiki
 Justin Hammer at Comic Vine

Action film villains
Characters created by Bob Layton
Characters created by David Michelinie
Characters created by John Romita Jr.
Comics characters introduced in 1979
Fictional businesspeople
Fictional cryonically preserved characters in comics
Fictional English people
Iron Man characters
Male film villains
Marvel Comics male supervillains